Andreas Apostolidis (Greek: Ανδρέας Αποστολίδης) is a Greek crime novelist, documentary director and screenwriter. He is best known for the television work Reportage Without Frontiers and Tanzanian documentary A Place Without People.

Career
In 1986 he directed, wrote and produced his debut short film Gri kyrioi. After the success of the film, he made the sequel of the short titled Gri kyrioi 2 in 1990. Then in 1999, he made his film debut by direction the film Dirty Greeks. In 2005, Apostolidis directed his maiden documentary The Ring. In 2002 he directed the documentary Death Match and then made a documentary about the illegal trade of antiquities titled Network in 2006.

After that, he moved to direct many television series documentaries such as Dyo fores xenos (2010), and 1821 (2011). In 2007,  he directed over 125 episodes of the television documentary series Reportage Without Frontiers produced by Stelios Kouloglou. The serial later won the Best Documentary Award of the Year in Greece for record six consecutive years.

In 2010, he directed the critics acclaimed documentary A Place Without People which is based on Tanzania and its forests and native culture. The film received critics acclaim. In May 2010, at the Green Film Festival in Seoul, the film won the Jury Award as well as nominated at several film festivals.

Filmography

References

External links
 

Living people
Greek film directors
Greek people
1939 births